Warby Parker is an American online retailer of prescription glasses, contact lenses, and sunglasses, based in New York City. Warby Parker was founded as primarily online retailer, but now sells primarily (about 90%) through approximately 160 physical retail store locations across the U.S. and Canada.

History 
The company was founded in 2010 in Philadelphia by Neil Blumenthal, Andrew Hunt, David Gilboa, and Jeffrey Raider and is headquartered in New York City. The name "Warby Parker" derives from two characters that appear in a journal by author Jack Kerouac. The company's official corporate name is JAND Inc. and "Warby Parker" is the company's trade name.

The company was started in the Venture Initiation Program of the Wharton School of the University of Pennsylvania, where the founders all studied. The company received $2,500 seed investment through the program and launched in February 2010. Shortly after launching, the company was covered by Vogue. In May 2011, Warby Parker raised its first round of funding totaling $2.5 million. In September 2011, the company raised a Series A round of $12.5 million. In fall 2012, it raised a $37 million Series B round, with an additional $4 million announced in February 2013 with investors American Express and Mickey Drexler. In 2011, Warby Parker shipped more than 100,000 pairs of glasses and had 60 employees. By the end of 2012, the company had grown to around 100 employees. As of April 2015, the company was valued at $1.2 billion.

In 2016, the company announced plans to create an optical lab in Rockland County, New York, to create and manufacture their glasses in-house instead of paying external manufacturers. The proposed lab would have 34,000 square feet and would employ 130 staff. The company said it had planned to invest $16 million to create the facility. The optical lab was opened in 2017.

On March 14, 2018, Warby Parker raised $75 million in Series E funding, making its total funding about $300 million.

On August 27, 2020, Warby Parker raised $245 million, valued at $3 billion. The $245 million was a combination of a Series F round and a Series G round.

On September 29, 2021, the company went public on the New York Stock Exchange via a direct listing, opening at $54.05 a share.

Retail model 

The company primarily sells eyewear online and through its multiple locations throughout the United States and Canada. Warby Parker's "Home-Try-On program" is a strategy used by the company in which its customers select five frames from the website, which they receive and try on at home within a 5-day period, free of charge. The company has programs where customers upload a photo and try on frames virtually through their mobile app.

Warby Parker began operating online exclusively in 2010 and opened its first store in 2013. As Warby Parker's revenue started to grow, the company began opening brick-and-mortar showrooms across the country. Following the opening of its retail stores, the company announced its plan to build its own point of sale (POS) system, which was being used in their stores by 2015. It also expanded in 2015 with the brand's first national retail partnership with Nordstrom, which allowed the company to establish six curated pop-up shops nationwide. As of 2017, Warby Parker operated around 71 locations in 28 U.S. states and Washington, D.C., according to Slice Intelligence, along with two stores in Toronto and one in Vancouver. According to CNBC, due to steady growth and the success of the physical storefronts, the company planned to operate nearly 100 stores across the U.S. by the end of 2018.

Products 
Warby Parker designs its product in-house, and sells directly to consumers through its website and stores. The company orders its own materials, such as acetate, from Italy and then manufactures frames at the same Chinese factories as competitors such as Luxottica. On average, a Warby Parker customer completes more than one order per year and buys an average of 1.5 units per order. In addition to eyeglasses, sunglasses, and contact lenses, Warby Parker sells monocles, which are available with prescription lenses.

In 2019, the company launched their brand of daily contacts, "Scout, by Warby Parker".

In 2019, the company introduced a virtual try-on augmented reality app to show users how a pair of glasses would look on their face. This was recognized as one of the "100 Best Inventions of 2019" by Time.

Corporate social responsibility 
Warby Parker uses a social entrepreneurship model, described as "buy one, give one". For each pair of glasses purchased, the company pays for the production of another pair of eyeglasses for the nonprofit organization VisionSpring. In June 2014, Warby Parker announced that it had distributed one million pairs of eyeglasses to people in need. As of 2022, the company has distributed over ten million pairs of glasses through their "Buy a Pair, Give a Pair" program.  The company also claims to be 100% carbon neutral.

The company received B Corp certification soon after its founding but let the status lapse by choosing against reincorporating as a public benefit corporation. Warby Parker later became a public benefit corporation in mid-2021 just prior to their initial public offering.

References

External links 
 

Sunglasses
American companies established in 2010
Retail companies established in 2010
Internet properties established in 2010
Publicly traded companies based in New York City
Eyewear brands of the United States
Eyewear companies of the United States
Eyewear retailers of Canada
Eyewear retailers of the United States
Online retailers of the United States
Companies listed on the New York Stock Exchange
2010 establishments in Pennsylvania
Direct stock offerings
B Lab-certified corporations